Burhan Belge (February 1, 1899 – January 12, 1967) was a Turkish politician and diplomat, who was a prominent figure among the young intellectuals during the early periods of Republic of Turkey and served as the representative of Muğla province during the 11th term of Turkish National Assembly. He was a regular contributor to Kadro, a left-wing journal dedicated to "discussions on ideology and economic-development strategy." In the 1950s he began to write for the Democrat Party newspaper Zafer.   

He is the father of prominent Turkish intellectual Murat Belge and the first husband of actress Zsa Zsa Gabor (from May 1935 to December 1941), who he met in Hungary while serving as Ambassador of Turkey to Budapest. Gabor was 18 years old when they married and they did not have any children together. He was also a brother-in-law of Yakup Kadri Karaosmanoğlu.

References

External links

|-
!colspan="3" style="background:#C1D8FF;"| Husband of a Gabor Sister

Syrian people of Turkish descent
1899 births
1967 deaths
Deputies of Muğla
Members of the 11th Parliament of Turkey
Republican People's Party (Turkey) politicians
Democrat Party (Turkey, 1946–1961) politicians
20th-century Turkish journalists